The Beech River is a  river located in eastern New Hampshire in the United States. It is a tributary of the Pine River, part of the Ossipee Lake / Saco River watershed leading to the Atlantic Ocean.

The Beech River begins at the outlet of Upper Beech Pond in the northern part of Wolfeboro, New Hampshire. The river flows north for one mile and enters Lower Beech Pond in the town of Tuftonboro. Resuming its course, it heads generally northeast into Ossipee, passing through Garland Pond and reaching the Pine River near the village of Center Ossipee.

See also

List of rivers of New Hampshire

References

Rivers of New Hampshire
Rivers of Carroll County, New Hampshire